Cornelius Cornelii à Lapide  (né Cornelis Cornelissen van den Steen; 18 December 1567 – 12 March 1637) was a Flemish Catholic priest. He was a Jesuit and exegete of Sacred Scripture.

Life

He was born at Bocholt, in Belgian Limburg.  He studied humanities and philosophy at the Jesuit colleges of Maastricht and Cologne, first theology for half a year at the University of Douai and afterwards for four years at the Old University of Leuven; he entered the Society of Jesus on 11 June 1592 and, after a novitiate of two years and another year of theology, was ordained a Catholic priest on 24 December 1595. After teaching philosophy for half a year, he was made a professor of Sacred Scripture at Leuven in 1596 and next year of Hebrew also. During his professorship at Leuven it pleased him to spend his holidays preaching and administering the Sacraments, especially at the pilgrimage of Scherpenheuvel (Montaigu). Twenty years later in 1616 he was called to Rome in the same capacity, where, on 3 November, he assumed the office that he held for many years thereafter. The latter years of his life, however, he apparently devoted exclusively to completing and correcting his commentaries. He died in Rome on 12 March 1637.

He described himself in a prayer to the Prophets at the end of his commentary on the Book of Daniel: "For nearly thirty years I suffer with and for You [God] with gladness the continual martyrdom of religious life, the martyrdom of illness, the martyrdom of study and writing; obtain for me also, I beseech You, to crown all, the fourth martyrdom, of blood. For You I have spent my vital and animal spirits; I will spend my blood too."

Works

Cornelius a Lapide wrote commentaries on all the books of the Catholic Canon of Scripture, i.e., including the deuterocanonical books, except the Book of Job and the Psalms. Even before departing Flanders, he edited the Commentaries in omnes divi Pauli epistolas in 1614 and In Pentateuchum (On the Pentateuch) in 1616, both in Antwerp. The commentaries on the Greater and Lesser Prophets, Acts of the Apostles, Canonical Epistles and the Apocalypse of Saint John, Wisdom of Sirach, and Book of Proverbs followed later. The remainder were edited posthumously, and all of them have been re-edited several times severally and collectively. Of the Commentary on the Epistles of Saint Paul he lived to see at least eleven editions.

The complete series, with the Book of Job and the Psalms added by others, was published in Antwerp in 1681 and 1714; in Venice in 1717, 1740, and 1798; in Cologne in 1732; in Turin in 1838; in Lyons in 1839–42, 1865, and 1866; in Malta in 1843–46; in Naples in 1854; in Lyons and Paris in 1855 and 1856; in Milan in 1857; and in Paris in 1859–63. To the most widely mentioned edition, Crampon and Péronne added complementary annotations from later interpreters. All of the aforementioned commentaries are great in scope. They explain not only the literal, but also the allegorical, tropological, and anagogical senses of the Sacred Scriptures and provide numerous quotations of the Church Fathers and mediaeval interpreters. Like most of his predecessors and contemporaries, a Lapide intended to serve the historical and scientific study of the Sacred Scriptures and, more so, pious meditation and especially homiletic exposition. An extract from the commentary on the Acts of the Apostles appeared in 1737 in Tyrnau under the title Effigies Sancti Pauli, sive idea vitae apostolicae. A large work in four volumes, Les trésors de Cornelius a Lapide: extraits de ses commentaires de l'écriture sainte à l'usage des prédicateurs, des communautés et des familles chrétiennes by Abbé Barbier was published in Le Mans and Paris in 1856, re-edited in Paris in 1859, 1872, 1876, 1885, and 1896; and translated into Italian by F. M. Faber and published in Parma in 1869–70, in 10 volumes over 16 months.

G. H. Goetzius authored an academic dissertation, Exercitatio theologica de Cornelii a Lapide Commentariis in Sacram Scripturam (Leipzig, 1699), in which he praised a Lapide as the most important Catholic scriptural commentator. 

Thomas W. Mossman, an Anglican clergyman, translated some of the New Testament commentaries into English under the title The Great Commentary of Cornelius a Lapide (London, 1876):

 The Gospels of St. Matthew, St. Mark, St. Luke, and St. John

 St. Paul's Epistles to the Corinthians and the Galatians

 St. John's 1st, 2nd and 3rd Epistles

A manuscript in the Vatican Library contains an Arabic translation of the Commentary on the Apocalypse of Saint John by the Maronite Yusuf ibn Girgis (beginning of the eighteenth century), who also purportedly translated the Commentary on the Epistles of Saint Paul.

Regarding Papal supremacy and the consequences of a Pope espousing heresy, he said:For the Pope in the Church is more than a king in a kingdom: for this king receives power from his own republic, [while] the Pope truly does not receive his power from the Church, but immediately from God: therefore in no case is he able to be deposed by the Church, but only to be declared to have fallen out of the Pontificate. If (God forbid) he were to fall into public heresy, he would accordingly ipso facto cease to be pope, aye, [he would ipso facto cease to be] faithful and Christian.

References

External links
 
 The Great Biblical Commentary of Cornelius à Lapide (most of the New Testament)
 Scanned Volumes of the Commentary (archive.org)
 Lapide's complete commentary in Latin (1891, page photographs)
 (3rd ed. John Hodges, London, 1887)
 (4th ed. John Hodges, London,1890)

 

1567 births
1637 deaths
People from Limburg (Belgium)
Jesuits of the Spanish Netherlands
Catholic University of Leuven (1834–1968) alumni
Roman Catholic biblical scholars
University of Douai alumni
Roman Catholic theologians of the Spanish Netherlands
Jesuit theologians
17th-century biblical scholars
16th-century Christian biblical scholars
17th-century Christian biblical scholars